Don Gardner (born December 9, 1997) is an American football cornerback for the Tampa Bay Buccaneers of the National Football League (NFL). He played college football at South Dakota State.

Professional career
Gardner signed with the Tampa Bay Buccaneers on April 30th after the 2022 NFL Draft as an undrafted free agent.  On August 30th Gardner was waived  but signed to the practice squad the next day.  He was elevated from the practice squad on October 27th  ahead of the Thursday night game against the Baltimore Ravens, that same day he made his NFL debut playing 14 snaps. He signed a reserve/future contract on January 17, 2023.

References

Living people
1997 births
American football cornerbacks
South Dakota State Jackrabbits football players
Tampa Bay Buccaneers players